B. L. Goenka, better known as Maung Shwe is the son of Vipassana expert S. N. Goenka and head of the Hindu Central Board in Myanmar.  He attended Myoma High School in Yangon.He also is the Chairman of Myanmar-India Merchants' Association.

Notes

References
Kesavapany, K. (2008) Rising India and indian communities in East Asia. Institute of Southeast Asian Studies. 

Year of birth missing (living people)
Living people
Burmese people of Indian descent
Burmese civil servants
Burmese Hindus